New York’s 20th congressional district is a congressional district for the United States House of Representatives in New York's Capital District.  It includes all of Albany and Schenectady counties, and portions of Montgomery, Rensselaer, and Saratoga counties.

From 2003 to 2013, the 20th district surrounded the Capital District, which had been part of the 21st district. This district included all or parts of Columbia, Dutchess, Delaware, Essex, Greene, Otsego, Rensselaer, Saratoga, Warren, and Washington counties.  It included the cities of Glens Falls and Saratoga Springs. This largely rural district stretched to include parts of the Adirondacks, Catskills and Hudson Valley.

On November 2, 2010, Republican Chris Gibson defeated first-term incumbent Democrat Scott Murphy, and took office on January 3, 2011. In 2013, Gibson was redistricted to the 19th. Democrat Paul Tonko now represents the district after redistricting.

Voting

History 

 1825–?: (two seats) comprising St. Lawrence, Jefferson, Lewis and Oswego counties.

 1875–1893: Montgomery
 1913–1973: Parts of Manhattan
 1973–1983: Parts of Bronx, Manhattan
 1983–1993: Parts of Westchester
 1993–2003: All of Rockland, Parts of Orange, Sullivan, Westchester
 2003–2013: All of Columbia, Greene, Warren, Washington, Parts of Delaware, Dutchess, Essex, Otsego, Rensselaer, Saratoga
 2013–2023: All of Albany, Schenectady, Parts of Montgomery, Rensselaer, Saratoga
 2023–present: All of Albany, Saratoga, Schenectady, Parts of Rensselaer

Various New York districts have been numbered "20" over the years, including areas in New York City and various parts of upstate New York.

List of members representing the district

1813–1833: Two seats 
From the creation of the district in 1813 to 1833, two seats were apportioned, elected at-large on a general ticket.

1833–present: One seat

Election results
In New York State electoral politics there are numerous minor parties at various points on the political spectrum. Certain parties will invariably endorse either the Republican or Democratic candidate for every office, hence the state electoral results contain both the party votes, and the final candidate votes (Listed as "Recap").

See also

List of United States congressional districts
New York's congressional districts
United States congressional delegations from New York

References

 Congressional Biographical Directory of the United States 1774–present
 2004 House election data Clerk of the House of Representatives
 2002 House election data
 2000 House election data
 1998 House election data
 1996 House election data

20
Constituencies established in 1813
1813 establishments in New York (state)